The Killke culture occupied the South American region around Cusco, Peru from 900 to 1200 AD, prior to the development of Incan culture in the 13th century.

Killke culture flourished in highland Peru in the Late Intermediate Period around what is now Cusco. Archaeologist Oscar Rodriguez suggests that the Killke built small sections of the fortress Saksaywaman during the 12th century, prior to the Incan expansion of the site.

In 2007, excavations uncovered a temple on the edge of the fortress, indicating religious as well as military use of the site.

Killke ceramics first were described by John H. Rowe. These vessels often are globular with vertical strap-handles and having simple linear geometric decorations of black or black-on-red over a white or buff slip.

It was the American archaeologist John Howland Rowe (1918–2004) who named the Killke culture.

See also
Wari culture
History of the Incas

References

Bibliography
 Dwyer, E. B. 1971. The Early Inca Occupation of the Valley of Cuzco, Peru. Unpublished PhD thesis, University of California, Berkeley.
  Ixer, R. A. "The Petrography of Certain Pre-Spanish Pottery from Peru," https://web.archive.org/web/20111113233438/http://www.goodprovenance.com/incapots.htm. Accessed 15 March 2008.

Andean civilizations
Archaeological cultures of South America
10th-century establishments in South America
12th-century disestablishments in South America
2007 archaeological discoveries